Badet may refer to:

People
Régina Badet (1876–1949), French comedic performer

Other
Efter badet, 1976 sculpture by Pye Engström